Gitta Gyenes (1888–1960) was a Hungarian painter. Known for early innovations in Hungarian porcelain painting, she has one painting ("Parkban") on display in the Hungarian National Gallery.

References 

1888 births
1960 deaths
20th-century Hungarian painters
Hungarian women artists
20th-century Hungarian women artists